Anetan Constituency is one of the constituencies of Nauru and is made up of two districts: Anetan and Ewa. It covers an area of 2.2 km², and has a population of 1,180. It returns two members to the Parliament of Nauru in Yaren.

Members of Parliament

Election results

References

External links

Constituencies of Nauru